The Zambia National U-17 Football team is the U-17 football team for Zambia founded in 1929. The team, also known as the Junior Chipolpolo, represents the country in international under-17 matches and is controlled by the Football Association of Zambia. In 2016, they were disqualified from the 2016 COSAFA Under-17 Championship because two players were found to have been over the age of 17.

Competitive record

FIFA U-17 World Cup
 1985 - Did not qualify
 1987 - Withdrew
 1989 - Did not qualify
 1991 - Did not qualify
 1993 - Did not enter
 1995 - Disqualified
 1997 - Did not enter
 1999 - Did not qualify
 2001 - Did not qualify
 2003 - Did not qualify
 2005 - Did not enter
 2007 - Did not qualify
 2009 - Did not qualify
 2011 - Did not qualify
 2013 - Did not qualify
 2015 - Did not qualify
 2017 - Did not qualify
 2019 - Did not Qualify
 2023 - To be determined

CAF U-16 and U-17 World Cup Qualifiers
 1985 - Did not qualify
 1987 - Withdrew
 1989 - Did not qualify
 1991 - Did not qualify
 1993 - Did not enter

African U-17 Championship
 1995 - Disqualified
 1997 - Did not enter
 1999 - Did not qualify
 2001 - Did not qualify
 2003 - Did not qualify
 2005 - Did not enter
 2007 - Did not qualify
 2009 - Did not qualify
 2011 - Did not qualify
 2013 - Did not qualify
 2015 - Group Stage
 2017 - Did not qualify

Current squad 
 The following players were called up for the 2023 Africa U-17 Cup of Nations qualification matches.
 Match dates: 3, 5, 7 and 9 December 2022

See also 
Zambia women's national under-17 football team

Zambia men's national under-20 football team

References

External links
  (Fan site)
  (Football Association of Zambia)

African national under-17 association football teams
under-17